The Moises Padilla Story is a 1961 Philippine bio-pic directed by Gerardo de León. The film was selected as the Philippine entry for the Best Foreign Language Film at the 34th Academy Awards, but was not accepted as a nominee. The film is a biography of a Negros Occidental mayoral candidate who in 1951, was tortured and murdered by the private army of the provincial governor after he had refused to withdraw his candidacy.

The film is still extant and has been restored in 4K resolution by the Philippine Film Archive and Central Digital Lab in 2022. The restored version was premiered on September 2, 2022, in celebration of the Philippine Film Industry Month.

Cast
 Leopoldo Salcedo as Moises Padilla
 Joseph Estrada as The Killer
 Lilia Dizon
 Ben Perez
 Oscar Roncal
 Max Alvarado
 Rosa Aguirre
 Robert Arevalo
 Mila Montañez
 Alfonso Carvajal
 Joseph de Cordova

References

External links
 

1961 films
Tagalog-language films
1961 drama films
Films directed by Gerardo de León
Philippine biographical films